Nevyana Mihaylova Miteva (born 2 May 1970) is a retired Bulgarian swimmer. She competed at the 1988 Summer Olympics in the 100 m and 200 m butterfly and 4 × 100 m medley relay events and reached the final in the relay, her team finishing in sixth place.

She has two master's degrees, one in physical education, and the other in "organization and management of operational and tactical formations of the Air Force", from a military academy. She is a lieutenant colonel working at the general staff office of the Bulgarian Army in  Sofia.

She has a brother, Dimitar Mitev.

She was the running mate of Anastas Gerdzhikov in the 2021 Bulgarian general election.

See also
List of Bulgarian records in swimming

References

1970 births
Living people
Bulgarian female swimmers
Female butterfly swimmers
Swimmers at the 1988 Summer Olympics
Olympic swimmers of Bulgaria
21st-century Bulgarian women politicians
21st-century Bulgarian politicians